Runovići is a municipality in the Split-Dalmatia County. It has a population of 2,409 (2011 census), 99.71% which are Croats. There are three settlements in the municipality:
 Podosoje, population 40
Runović, population 2,024
 Slivno, population 352

References

Populated places in Split-Dalmatia County
Municipalities of Croatia